His Greatest Sacrifice is a 1921 American drama film directed by J. Gordon Edwards and written by Paul Sloane. The film stars William Farnum, Alice Fleming, Lorna Volare, Evelyn Greeley, Frank Goldsmith and Charles Wellesley. The film was released on April 17, 1921, by Fox Film Corporation.

Cast            
William Farnum as Richard Hall
Alice Fleming as Alice Hall
Lorna Volare as Grace Hall
Evelyn Greeley as Mrs. Oliver
Frank Goldsmith as James Hamilton
Charles Wellesley as John Reed
Henry Leone as Rimini

References

External links
 

1921 films
1920s English-language films
Silent American drama films
1921 drama films
Fox Film films
Films directed by J. Gordon Edwards
American silent feature films
American black-and-white films
1920s American films